Martin James Pflieger Schienle (born July 30, 1982), professionally known as Martin Starr, is an American actor and comedian. He is known for the television roles of Bill Haverchuck on the short-lived comedy drama Freaks and Geeks (1999–2000), Roman DeBeers on the comedy series Party Down (2009–2010, 2023), Bertram Gilfoyle on the HBO series Silicon Valley (2014–2019), for his film roles in Knocked Up (2007) and Adventureland (2009), and as Roger Harrington in the Marvel Cinematic Universe films The Incredible Hulk (2008), Spider-Man: Homecoming (2017), Spider-Man: Far From Home (2019), and Spider-Man: No Way Home (2021).

Personal life
Starr was born in Santa Monica, California, the son of actress Jean St. James (née Pflieger). He is of German, British, and Eastern European descent. He is a Buddhist.

In an interview with Wired, Starr said that he felt "frustrated and depressed" at 22 due to lack of offers in the years after Freaks and Geeks was cancelled. He had fired his agent and decided to quit acting altogether; however, a few years later he was offered Knocked Up, and other offers then started to come his way.

Career

Starr was cast as Bill Haverchuck in the NBC sitcom Freaks and Geeks. The series received positive reviews from critics, but it suffered from low ratings and was canceled after only one season. It gained a strong cult following. Starr then had a number of guest appearances and one-time roles on shows such as Ed, Mysterious Ways, Providence, King of the Hill, and Normal, Ohio. He had a small recurring role during the third season of Roswell as the character Monk. In 2002, Starr appeared in the films Stealing Harvard and Cheats. He reunited with both Freaks and Geeks producer Judd Apatow and Freaks and Geeks co-star Seth Rogen when he made a guest appearance on Apatow's situational comedy Undeclared in the episode "The Perfect Date". In 2005, he appeared in the miniseries Revelations and the CBS sitcom How I Met Your Mother.

Starr co-starred in the 2007 comedy film Knocked Up, which was directed by Judd Apatow. The same year, he had small appearances in Superbad and Walk Hard: The Dewey Cox Story, both of which were produced by Apatow. Knocked Up was critically praised and was successful at the box office. The success of Knocked Up led to Starr having larger roles in films, such as Good Dick and Adventureland. Starr also appears in many well-received short films that premiere at film festivals, such as the Sundance Film Festival.

In 2008, Starr played Roger Harrington in The Incredible Hulk. He reprised the role in Spider-Man: Homecoming (2017), Spider-Man: Far From Home (2019) and Spider-Man: No Way Home (2021).

From 2009 to 2010, Starr was a series regular portraying Roman DeBeers on the Starz sitcom Party Down. The series was cancelled after two seasons and there were discussions of adapting the series into film, but this never came to fruition. From 2011 to 2013, he co-starred on the Adult Swim television series NTSF:SD:SUV::, in which he played Sam Stern. In 2011, Starr had a major role in the film A Good Old Fashioned Orgy and also had guest appearances on television series such as Mad Love, Community, and Childrens Hospital. In the latter he reprised his role of Roman DeBeers from Party Down. Starr reunited with Freaks and Geeks and Party Down cast member Lizzy Caplan in the 2012 film Save the Date, which premiered at the Sundance Film Festival. The same year he had a supporting role in the thriller film Deep Dark Canyon, as well as guest-starring on sitcoms Parks and Recreation and New Girl. 

In 2013, he had a small role playing himself in This Is the End, which was directed by Seth Rogen and Evan Goldberg. He had a starring role in the Kristen Bell film The Lifeguard, later working with her again in the film Veronica Mars. He has guest-starred on The Aquabats! Super Show!, Franklin & Bash, and Drunk History. In 2014, he was cast to play Bertram Gilfoyle in the HBO comedy Silicon Valley.

In 2019, Party Down's co-creator and producer Dan Etheridge announced plans for a reunion with the original cast (including Starr) during a discussion at Vulture Festival. The third season of the series premiere in February 2023.

Filmography

Film

Television

Web

References

External links
 
 

1982 births
20th-century American male actors
21st-century American male actors
American Buddhists
American male child actors
American male film actors
American male television actors
American people of German descent 
Living people
Male actors from Santa Monica, California